

Supreme Court Gardens is a park in the central business district of Perth, Western Australia, bounded by Riverside Drive, Barrack Street, Governors Avenue, and the buildings of the Supreme Court of Western Australia.

In the late 1880s Perth Water extended further north than its current boundary, and the river covered part of the area now occupied by the Supreme Court Gardens. What land there was south of the original court house and the Supreme Court building of the time was occupied by the police stables and Waterside Police Station. The police buildings were demolished in 1902 when a new Supreme Court building was constructed, and part of the river was reclaimed.

The gardens have had extensive trees, shrubbery and fencing, various small structures at different stages in the grounds in the past.

The gardens have at times been very poorly lit, and had many darkened areas due to the vegetation - this culminated in concerns in 1985  over safety due to inadequate lighting. By the 2000s large amounts of low shrubs and fences had been removed and better lighting introduced.

For many years The West Australian newspaper had an annual art show in the grounds.

The orchestral shell was constructed and opened in the grounds on 22 January 1956, and was burnt down in the 1990s.

The gardens have had a significant number of events and concerts, many associated with the Perth International Arts Festival.

See also
 Stirling Gardens, to the north of Supreme Court buildings

References

Further reading

External links
 

Parks in Perth, Western Australia
Barrack Street, Perth
State Register of Heritage Places in the City of Perth